São João de Ver is a Portuguese parish, located in the municipality of Santa Maria da Feira. The population in 2011 was 10,579, in an area of 15.37 km2.

Landmarks

Casa da Torre or Quinta da Torre
Traces of the royal road linking Lisbon - Porto in Airas

References

Freguesias of Santa Maria da Feira
Santa Maria da Feira